Kentucky Lake is a major navigable reservoir along the Tennessee River in Kentucky and Tennessee. It was created in 1944 by the Tennessee Valley Authority's impounding of the Tennessee River via Kentucky Dam for flood control and hydroelectric power. Nearby Lake Barkley is larger by volume.

It provides a source for hydro-electric power. Also, as one of the lakes alluded to by the name of Land Between The Lakes National Recreation Area, it is a recreational destination of western Kentucky and Tennessee.

Recreation
The lake is a desirable fishing area. Records for the largest of three species of fish ever taken in Kentucky have been set at this lake: white bass, Buffalo carp, and yellow perch. It is also the major attraction for two Kentucky state parks: Kentucky Dam Village State Resort Park to the north and Kenlake State Resort Park to the west.

See also

Dams and reservoirs of the Tennessee River
Land Between The Lakes National Recreation Area
Kenlake State Resort Park
Kentucky Dam Village State Resort Park
Eggner's Ferry Bridge

References

External links

Visitor's guide by Marshall County, Kentucky Tourist Commission
KentuckyLake.com Kentucky Lake, Lake Barkely & Land Between the Lakes Information
KentuckyLake.TV Collection of informational videos on Kentucky Lake
LBLGuide.com Informational site about Kentucky Lake and the Land Between the Lakes area
Kentucky Lake Guide by KFW

 

1944 establishments in Kentucky
1944 establishments in Tennessee
Reservoirs in Kentucky
Reservoirs in Tennessee
Protected areas of Calloway County, Kentucky
Protected areas of Lyon County, Kentucky
Protected areas of Trigg County, Kentucky
Protected areas of Marshall County, Kentucky
Tennessee River
Tennessee Valley Authority
Protected areas of Benton County, Tennessee
Bodies of water of Calloway County, Kentucky
Bodies of water of Lyon County, Kentucky
Bodies of water of Trigg County, Kentucky
Bodies of water of Marshall County, Kentucky
Bodies of water of Benton County, Tennessee